Musgu is a cluster of closely related language varieties of the Biu–Mandara subgroup of the Chadic languages spoken in Cameroon and Chad. The endonym is Mulwi. Blench (2006) classifies the three varieties as separate languages. Speakers of the extinct related language Muskum have switched to one of these.

Names
Muzuk is another name for the language. The term Mousgoum used in Cameroon is not used by the speakers themselves.

Munjuk languages
Munjuk languages:

Munjuk
Muzuk
Beege
Mpus
Vulum

Munjuk, from manjakay (H. Tourneux), refers to the a group of four related languages, not only Muzuk. Munjuk languages are spoken in northern Mayo-Danay Department (arrondissements of Maga, Yele, and Kai-Kai in the Far North Region).

Beege and Mpus are found in the flood plains of the Logone River, in (Logone-et-Chari department, Zina district); Diamaré department (Bogo district). Beege is found in the south (Djafga and Begué) and Mpus in the north (in Pouss). Vulum is found mainly in Chad.

References 

Languages of Cameroon
Biu-Mandara languages